Private Henry Casey (October 28, 1837 to May 9, 1919) was an American soldier who fought in the American Civil War. Casey received the country's highest award for bravery during combat, the Medal of Honor, for his action during the Battle of Vicksburg in Mississippi on 22 April 1863. He was honored with the award on 23 September 1897.

Biography
Casey was born in New Geneva, Pennsylvania on 28 October 1837. He enlisted into the 20th Ohio Infantry. He died on 9 May 1919 and his remains are interred at the Bloomingburg Cemetery in Ohio.

Medal of Honor citation

See also
List of American Civil War Medal of Honor recipients: A–F

Notes

References

External links
 Ohio in the Civil War: 20th Ohio Volunteer Infantry by Larry Stevens
 National flag of the 20th Ohio Infantry
 Regimental flag of the 20th Ohio Veteran Volunteer Infantry
 20th Ohio Infantry monument at Vicksburg
 Ohio Medal of Honor Recipients 

1837 births
1919 deaths
People of Ohio in the American Civil War
Union Army officers
United States Army Medal of Honor recipients
American Civil War recipients of the Medal of Honor